Adeel Akhtar Chaudry (born April 10, 1987) is a food connoisseur, restaurateur, Public Speaker and Chef. He is the first Pakistani food connoisseur to be featured in Forbes. Chaudry currently serves as an Advisor to Ministry of Science and Technology (Pakistan). He is also the founder of Junoon restaurant based in Lahore.

Early life 
Chaudry was born in Lahore on April 10, 1987. He did his schooling at Lahore School of Economics. He has been credited as an expert in Molecular Gastronomy and Food Fusion. Chaudry did his first theatre play named "KUKAR" with actor and songwriter Adeel Chaudhry.

Career 
Chaudry started his career in Dubai as a food enthusiast, he was inspired by the food in Dubai and later he founded his restaurant, "Junoon" in Lahore in 2018.

In 2019, Chaudry was invited by Salt Bae, a turkish restaurateur to collaborate for his restaurant in Pakistan. Later in 2021, He was appointed as an Advisor to Minister of Science and Technology, Agha Hassan Baloch. Chaudry served as a government official for a year. He was featured in Forbes as a Pakistani food connoisseur "who is Putting Pakistani Cuisine On The Global Food Map" because of his social media appearance for food presentation.

Chaudry gave an interview to BBC Asian Network. Later the interview was published on BBC's facebook page in 2019. He was also one of the speakers for TEDx Kinnaird conference that held in May at Kinnaird College for Women, Lahore where "Opportunities in times of crisis" were discussed.Azarbaijan delegation met adeel chaudry in Baku to discuss tourism in Pakistan in 2023 and took necessary steps to improve the tourism departments of Azerbaijan and Pakistan.

Honours 
 Ranked among the top 5 Most handsome Muslim food connoisseurs in the world in 2019 by Gulf Today
 First Pakistani food connoisseur to be featured in forbes:2021.

See also 

 Ministry of Science and Technology (Pakistan)
 Adeel Chaudhry

References 

Living people
1987 births